Cecil Stanley Margo , QC, FRAeS (born 10 July 1915, Johannesburg, Transvaal, Union of South Africa, died 19 November 2000, Johannesburg, Gauteng) was a South African Supreme Court Justice and war hero.

Family

Cecil Margo was the fifth child of Saul Lewis Margo and Amelia Hilson, South African immigrants of Eastern European Jewish descent.

Post War and Israel

In 1948, Margo had started a flourishing career as a trial lawyer aided by his record as a war hero. One day, he returned to his chambers from court and found an urgent telegram from David Ben-Gurion. Ben Gurion asked Margo to come out to Israel to serve as Ben Gurion's chief advisor on the establishment and organization of the Israeli Air Force. Though he had been in combat for years as a pilot in World War II and now had a wife and small child, Margo later wrote in his memoirs that he felt he had to go. The newly declared State of Israel had been attacked by the armies of five Arab countries and its prospects for survival were dim. Ben Gurion, who knew that air power would be critical to Israel's immediate and long range survival, had heard of Margo from his commanders such as Yaakov Dori and Chaim Laskov. Margo's effectiveness as a squadron commander, his expertise in air warfare in both the Desert and Europe during World War II, and his experience of high level command in the Royal Air Force as Operations Staff Officer, Advanced Air HQ, Desert Air Force, made him ideal for the job.

When Margo arrived in Israel, he assessed the issues and needs of the fledgling Israeli Air Force. He hammered out visionary blueprints and strategies for a small, but highly efficient and powerful air force. On the foundation of Margo's work, the modern day Israeli Air Force was built. Ben Gurion, who developed an admiration and fondness for Margo, asked him to remain in Israel as commander of the Israeli Air Force with the rank of "Aluf" Major General. But Margo declined, preferring to return to the Union of South Africa to resume his legal practice. Upon returning to South Africa, he was instrumental in formulating and monitoring the Advanced Pilots Training Course in Germiston, where South Africans were trained as pilots for the Israeli Air Force. He remained a staunch supporter of Israel through the years, often returning and visiting Air Force bases.

According to the official Machal website, a party was given for Margo by the Israeli Air Force the night before he flew back to South Africa. "As the evening wore on, a comradeship was born, with the help of Foreign Minister, Moshe Sharett, as raconteur. He recalled his experiences as an officer in the Turkish Army in World War I and sang Turkish army songs. When the party finally ended, Margo laid his hands on the shoulders of Dov Judah, one of the flight commanders he had appointed and said: "Dov, whatever happens, attack, attack, attack! The instruction was to become the incantation of the IAF, the psychological property of every O.C. and every airman."

Appointment to the Supreme Court of South Africa

His assignment in Israel completed, Margo returned to the Johannesburg Bar and rapidly built up his legal practice. In 1959, he took silk and became a Queen's Counsel. In 1971, Margo was appointed to the bench as a Justice of the Supreme Court of South Africa. Soon after his appointment, Margo issued a landmark interdict against South Africa's notorious security police to protect the life of anti-apartheid activist Salim Essop. As a Justice, Margo also chaired commissions that reformed South Africa's tax, corporate and securities laws, as well as its aviation system.

Aircraft accident investigations and death

Margo's career is also highlighted by significant contributions to international aircraft accident investigation. He was appointed to investigate the following high-profile air disasters:

 the DC-6 accident, on September 18, 1961 near Ndola in what was the Central African Federation, and in which the then Secretary General of the United Nations, Dag Hammarskjöld was killed;
 the loss of the Rietbok, an SAA Viscount airliner, which crashed into the sea off East London in 1967;
 the crash of the Pretoria, an SAA Boeing 707 which crashed after take-off from Windhoek, South West Africa in 1968;
 the Tupolev Tu-134 air disaster in 1986 just inside South African territory, which killed Samora Machel, the then President of Mozambique, and 34 others;
 the Helderberg air disaster of 1987 which claimed 159 lives when an SAA Boeing 747-200, the Helderberg, crashed into the sea north-east of Mauritius.

While the Margo Commission could not determine a definite cause of the fire in the cargo hold that caused the Helderberg disaster, its findings resulted in changes that have reduced the risks of fires on international airliners and enhanced safety of aircraft that carry both passengers and cargo . Rumours about a cover-up of the cause of the Helderberg crash abounded for years - including the suggestion that the fire was caused by illicit cargo of rocket fuel and ammunition. But the credibility of the Margo Commission and its international panel of experts, including Astronaut and Eastern Airlines CEO Frank Borman, suggested otherwise. So did the fact that Margo insisted that the Helderberg's cockpit voice recorder be recovered from the wreckage, which lay on the ocean floor at a depth greater than that of the Titanic. Years later, South Africa's Truth and Reconciliation Commission  extensively investigated the findings of the Margo Commission and found that there was no evidence to justify repudiating the findings.

Cecil Margo received numerous awards during his lifetime and was an honorary fellow of the South African Institute of Mechanical Engineers; Honorary Deputy President of the International Association of Jewish Lawyers and Jurists; Honorary Fellow of the Hebrew University of Jerusalem and a Fellow Of The Royal Aeronautical Society in London. He continued flying until his late 70's and died in 2000. He is survived by three sons from his marriage to Marguerite Gisele Margo and four grandchildren.

Controversies

 Margo was criticised for discrediting testimonies of black witnesses during the investigation into the 1961 Ndola United Nations DC-6 Crash that killed Dag Hammarskjöld. Charcoal burners of the township of Twapia testified that they saw a second plane in the air, but were considered unreliable. Board secretary of Twapia, Timothy Kankasa, testified to Margo that he alerted the Rhodesian authorities of the location of the wreck, six hours before the wreck was found. This testimony was "ridiculed" by Margo.

References

External links

 Biography review
 Obituary, Dispatch Online

Fellows of the Royal Aeronautical Society
South African expatriates in Israel
South African lawyers
South African judges
South African Jews
South African Queen's Counsel
1915 births
2000 deaths